Louis-Vincent Thomas (20 May 1922 – 22 January 1994) was a French sociologist, anthropologist, ethnologist, and scholar whose specialty was Africa. He was the founder of thanatology. After having taught at Cheikh Anta Diop University, he became a sociology professor at Paris Descartes University.

His writings deal with socialism, burials, and systems of thought in sub-Saharan Africa. He conducted comparative studies on death in Western culture and African culture. He often denounced the idea that anthropology and sociology are separate areas of study.

Writings

See also

Bibliography

External links
CAIRN
Thanatology according to Louis-Vincent Thomas
Information about thanatology doesn't exist

1922 births
1994 deaths
French anthropologists
French ethnologists
French sociologists
Academic staff of the University of Paris
Academic staff of Cheikh Anta Diop University
French male writers
20th-century anthropologists
20th-century French male writers